Saad Surour Mas'ud Surour Beniyas (born 19 July 1990) is an Emirati professional football player who plays as a defender for the United Arab Emirates national football team. He competed at the 2012 Summer Olympics.

References

1990 births
Living people
Emirati footballers
Olympic footballers of the United Arab Emirates
Footballers at the 2012 Summer Olympics
UAE Pro League players
UAE First Division League players
Asian Games medalists in football
Footballers at the 2010 Asian Games
Al Ahli Club (Dubai) players
Al Jazira Club players
Baniyas Club players
Al-Wasl F.C. players
Emirates Club players
Ajman Club players
Asian Games silver medalists for the United Arab Emirates
Association football defenders
Medalists at the 2010 Asian Games